Cottunculus nudus, the bonyskull toadfish, is a species of fish in the family Psychrolutidae (blobfishes) found in the Southwest Pacific Ocean off New Zealand at depths down to .

References

nudus
Fish described in 1989
Taxa named by Joseph S. Nelson
Fish of the North Atlantic